Helen Calcutt (born 27 March 1988), is a British poet, dancer, and choreographer.

Writing career 

Helen was one of the six poets selected to perform at the Commonwealth Games Opening Ceremony 2022, hosted in Birmingham. Her poem 'Mother, the city', written for the ceremony, was performed as part of its major opening scene 'Everything to Everybody', and was heard by over one and half billion people around the globe.

Calcutt is the author of three volumes of poetry. Her debut collection 'Sudden rainfall' was published by British publishing house Perdika Press when she was just 23 years old. It was a PBS Choice on publication and became Waterstone's best-selling pamphlet in 2016. Her most recent collection 'Somehow' was published by Verve Press in September 2020. It was a PBS Winter Bulletin Pamphlet, and Poetry School Book of the Year (2020, shortlist). 

Helen also writes for the Guardian, the Huffington Post, Poetry London, and the Wales Arts Review.

Dance 

Calcutt is also a professional dancer, performer, and choreographer. She has directed movement for theatre, site-specific productions, and independent film, working with a specialism in the conversation between text and movement.

Helen originally trained in jazz and commercial dance, before studying contemporary movement at Trinity Laban, and later moving into dance-theatre and movement direction. She is also a Latin and Cuban salsa dancer.

Activism 

Calcutt is an activist for mental health awareness, and male suicide prevention. She is the creator and editor of the acclaimed poetry anthology, 'Eighty Four' The title stands for the number of men who take their lives every week in the U.K.

The book was published by Verve Poetry Press (2019) was shortlisted for the Saboteur Best Anthology Award, 2019, and was a Poetry Wales Book of The Year 2019.

Helen lost her own brother to suicide in September 2017.

Bibliography 
 2013: Sudden rainfall, Perdika Press, 
 2018: Unable Mother, V.Press, 
 2019: Anthology Eighty Four Verve Poetry Press 
 2020: Somehow Verve Poetry Press,

Personal life 

Helen lives with her two children.

References

External links
 
 The Guardian, author page 
 The Huffington Post, author page
 The Lampeter Review, Issue 6 2012
 Perdika Press
 

English women poets
Living people
1988 births
Alumni of the University of Wolverhampton
People from the Black Country
English women journalists
English female dancers
English women non-fiction writers